Estonian Poetry is poetry written in the Estonian language or in Estonia.

History

The earliest known poetry written in Estonia was in the Latin language. The first poems written in the Estonian language came from Baltic German estophiles. The development of Estonian poetry occurred during the time of the Noor-Eesti ("Young Estonia") movement.

Kristjan Jaak Peterson (1801-1822) is commonly regarded as one of the founders of Estonian poetry. Following him, the heyday of national romantic poetry took over as the most prominent examples of Estonian poetry led by poets like Lydia Koidula.

See also
Estonian haiku

References

External links
Johannes Aavik, Puudused uuemas eesti luules [Deficiencies in modern Estonian poetry], published in 13 parts in Eesti Kirjandusest [Estonian Literature], 1921-1922 ( from Sõjaeelse Eesti esseistika ja kirjanduskriitika [Pre-war Estonian essays and literary criticism] archive)

 
Estonian literature
Poetry by country